John Thomas William Haines (24 April 1920 – 13 March 1987) was an English professional footballer who played as an inside forward. During his playing career, Haines made over 300 appearances in the Football League, and earned one cap for the English national side in 1948.

Career

Club career
Born in Wickhamford, Haines played his early football for Evesham Town, Badsey Rangers, Charlton Kings and Cheltenham Town, before joining Liverpool in 1937. He never made a league appearance for Liverpool, and his playing career was interrupted in 1939 by World War II. When play resumed in 1946, Haines moved to Swansea Town, and later played for Leicester City, West Bromwich Albion, Bradford Park Avenue, Rochdale and Chester, before playing non-league football with Wellington United, Kidderminster Harriers and Evesham Town.

During the war, Haines guested for clubs including Wrexham, Doncaster Rovers, Notts County, Bradford Park Avenue and Lincoln City.

International career
Haines made his international debut for England on 2 December 1948 against Switzerland. He scored twice in a 6–0 victory but was never selected again.

References

External links
Profile at Post War English & Scottish Football League A – Z Player's Database
Profile at England Stats

1920 births
1987 deaths
English footballers
Association football inside forwards
England international footballers
Cheltenham Town F.C. players
Liverpool F.C. players
Swansea City A.F.C. players
Leicester City F.C. players
West Bromwich Albion F.C. players
Bradford (Park Avenue) A.F.C. players
Rochdale A.F.C. players
Chester City F.C. players
English Football League players
Telford United F.C. players
Kidderminster Harriers F.C. players
Wrexham F.C. wartime guest players
Doncaster Rovers F.C. wartime guest players
Notts County F.C. wartime guest players
Bradford (Park Avenue) A.F.C. wartime guest players
Lincoln City F.C. wartime guest players
Evesham United F.C. players